

This is a list of the National Register of Historic Places listings in St. Joseph County, Michigan.

This is intended to be a complete list of the properties and districts on the National Register of Historic Places in St. Joseph County, Michigan, United States. Latitude and longitude coordinates are provided for many National Register properties and districts; these locations may be seen together in a map.

There are 16 properties and districts listed on the National Register in the county.

Current listings

|}

Listings Formerly Located in St. Joseph County
The following listings were located in St. Joseph County at the time they were placed on the Register, but have since moved to other locations.

See also

 List of Michigan State Historic Sites in St. Joseph County, Michigan
 List of National Historic Landmarks in Michigan
 National Register of Historic Places listings in Michigan
 Listings in neighboring counties: Branch, Calhoun, Cass, Elkhart (IN), Kalamazoo, LaGrange (IN), Van Buren

References

 
St. Joseph County